The escudo was the currency of Portuguese India between 1958 and 1961. It was subdivided into 100 centavos and was equal in value to the Portuguese escudo. After Portuguese India was annexed by the Republic of India in 1961, the escudo was replaced by the Indian rupee.

History
The escudo replaced the rupia at the rate of 1 rupia = 6 escudos. This was due to the respective values of the Indian rupee (to which the rupia was pegged) and the Portuguese escudo, with one rupee equalling one shilling six pence (18 pence) sterling and one escudo equaling three pence.

Coins
Coins were introduced in 1958 in denominations of 10, 30 and 60 centavos, 1, 3 and 6 escudos. The 10 and 30 centavos were struck in bronze, the others in cupro-nickel.  Except for the 10 centavos, which was minted in 1961, none of these coins were produced after 1959.  All of them are common.

Banknotes
In 1959, notes were introduced by the Banco Nacional Ultramarino in denominations of 30, 60, 100, 300, 600 and 1000 escudos.

References

External links

 System Portuguese Indian escudo - Banknotes
 Indo-Portuguese Issues

Portuguese India
Modern obsolete currencies
Historical currencies of India
Economic history of Portugal
1958 establishments in Portuguese India
1961 disestablishments in Portuguese India
Escudo